"Vincent Price" is a song by British rock band Deep Purple. Featured on their 19th studio album, titled Now What?!, the track is both the second single from the album and the last track on it. The band confirmed the single's release on 6 May 2013, sending messages via their official webpage and Facebook account.

Featuring a hard rock and progressive metal inspired style, reminiscent of past horror films, the song came out on the following day. The group made it available as a digital download, as an expanded CD release, and as a seven-inch transparent vinyl record. The band created a music video for the track, their first official video as such in seventeen years, and it soon received distribution through various music related publications, Blabbermouth.net being an example. In terms of songwriting, all of the then current band-members (Don Airey, Ian Gillan, Roger Glover, Steve Morse, and Ian Paice) helped to compose the track alongside producer Bob Ezrin.

Background and song contents
The song is a tribute to the late classic horror movie icon Vincent Price, and it features sonic as well as lyrical references to numerous tropes associated with horror films. Examples include dramatic sounds of thunder and mysterious wailing noises as well as lyrical references to human sacrifice and vampirism. All of the then current Deep Purple band-members (Don Airey, Ian Gillan, Roger Glover, Steve Morse, and Ian Paice) served as songwriters for the tune alongside producer Bob Ezrin. Coming out of the group's typical jams, its style is reminiscent of instrumental film soundtracks while also having a hard rock and progressive metal based sound.

In terms of the track's creation, Deep Purple frontman Ian Gillan has remarked,

Price had worked with both Gillan and Glover earlier in their careers. For Glover, it was during the recording of his concert performance The Butterfly Ball and the Grasshopper's Feast, a Royal Albert Hall event which was recorded on 16 October 1975. A related film came out the following year.

Release information

Deep Purple as a group decided to release "Vincent Price" as a digital download, through an expanded CD release, and also as a seven-inch transparent vinyl record. The band additionally created a music video for the track. Their first official video as such in over twenty years, it soon received distribution through various music related publications, Blabbermouth.net being an example.

Critic Steve Leggett, writing for Allmusic, praised "Vincent Price" as a "massive, powerful, and just slightly eerie" tune. He additionally lauded the parent album, Leggett remarking that Now What?! features "a swaggering confidence that is really pretty amazing" and has a "timeless" sound. Blabbermouth.net predicted that the special CD single and its related seven-inch vinyl record will become a "collector's item", noting their inclusion of the song "First Sign of Madness" that ended up dropped from the Now What?! album.

Track listing

7" single
 "Vincent Price"
 "First Sign of Madness"

CD single
 "Vincent Price" - 4:47
 "First Sign of Madness" - 4:26 (Non-album track)
 "The Well-Dressed Guitar" - 2:51
 "Wrong Man" - 4:30 (Live performance from a 10-10-2005 set in London)

See also
Deep Purple discography
"Thriller" (also referring to Price, with a cameo)
"The Black Widow" (also referring to Price, with a cameo)

References

External links
Deep Purple Main Website

Songs about actors
Deep Purple songs
2013 singles
2013 songs
Songs written by Bob Ezrin
Songs written by Ian Gillan
Songs written by Roger Glover
Songs written by Steve Morse
Songs written by Ian Paice
Song recordings produced by Bob Ezrin
Progressive metal songs